Grodziszcze may refer to:

Grodziszcze, Polkowice County in Lower Silesian Voivodeship (south-west Poland)
Grodziszcze, Świdnica County in Lower Silesian Voivodeship (south-west Poland)
Grodziszcze, Ząbkowice Śląskie County in Lower Silesian Voivodeship (south-west Poland)
Grodziszcze, Świebodzin County in Lubusz Voivodeship (west Poland)
Grodziszcze, Żary County in Lubusz Voivodeship (west Poland)

See also
Horodyszcze (disambiguation) (Ukrainian form written in Polish)
Horodyshche (disambiguation) (proper Ukrainian form)
Gorodishche, Russia (Russian form)
Hradiště (disambiguation) (Czech and Slovak form)
Grădiştea (disambiguation) (Romanian form)
Gradište (disambiguation) (South-Slavic form)